The World RX of Hockenheim is a Rallycross event held at the Hockenheimring in Baden-Württemberg, Germany for the FIA World Rallycross Championship. The event made its debut in the 2015 season.

Past winners

References

External links

Rallycross
Hockenheim